Eochia Union is a union parishad of Satkania Upazila in the Division of Chittagong, Bangladesh.

Area
Eochia Union's total area is 23.91 km2

Population 
As of 2011, Eochia Union total population is 19,925. There are male 9849 and female 10,076.

Union chairman 
The current chairman of Eochia is Abu Saleh.

List of previous chairmen

See also
 Madarsha Union

References

Unions of Satkania Upazila